John Gunn may refer to:

John Gunn (Australian politician) (1884–1959), 29th Premier of South Australia
John Gunn (Australian writer) (born 1925), Australian writer, sailor and aviation journalist
John Gunn (cricketer) (1876–1963), English cricketer
John Gunn (geologist) (1801–1890), English geologist
John Gunn (Manitoba politician) (1826–1898), politician in Manitoba, Canada
John Gunn (New South Wales politician) (1860–1910), Australian politician and pastoralist
John Gunn (Scottish writer) (c. 1765–c. 1824), Scottish cellist, writer on music, and professor
John Alexander Gunn (1896–1975), philosopher
John Currie Gunn (1916–2002),  Scottish scientist
John Edward Gunn (1863–1924), Irish-born prelate of the Roman Catholic Church
John Oliver Gunn Jr. (1939–2010), American race car driver
John R. Gunn (1877–1956), American clergyman
J. A. W. Gunn (born 1937), Canadian political philosopher
J. B. Gunn (1928–2008), discovered the Gunn effect and invented the Gunn diode
Salvatore Sincere (born 1966), wrestler who used the ring name Johnny Gunn

See also
John Gunne (1870–1935), Canadian politician
John Gunne (English politician) (fl. 1397)